Night Stalker is a television series that ran for six weeks in fall 2005 on ABC in The United States. The series starred Stuart Townsend as Carl Kolchak, an investigative reporter whose wife was murdered. Kolchak spends his time investigating other strange murders, believing they are linked in some way to his wife's murder. He is helped along the way by a fellow crime reporter Perri Reed (Gabrielle Union), photographer Jain McManus (Eric Jungmann) and editor Anthony Vincenzo (Cotter Smith).

Night Stalker was a remake of the 1974 series Kolchak: The Night Stalker. ABC owned the rights to the original television movies, but not the Universal television series, and was limited to using only characters that had appeared in those movies.

Characters

Main
 Carl Kolchak (Stuart Townsend): The believer. Reporter for the L.A. Beacon newspaper; continuously searches for his wife's murderer and supernatural happenings in Los Angeles.
 Perri Reed (Gabrielle Union): The skeptic. Head crime reporter for the L.A. Beacon, but she trails after Kolchak like a rookie. She helps Kolchak in his cases of the paranormal, although she looks at the cases normally.
 Jain McManus (Eric Jungmann): Kolchak's open-minded friend. He is a photographer for the L.A. Beacon.
 Anthony Vincenzo (Cotter Smith): Editor of the L.A. Beacon. A friend of Kolchak's who hired him as a favor after they worked together in Las Vegas.

Recurring
 Agent Bernie Fain (John Pyper-Ferguson): Kolchak's former friend in Las Vegas but now a nemesis, an FBI agent who believed Kolchak murdered his wife and made up a bizarre story to cover up his involvement. The character is loosely reworked from Agent Bernie Jenks, Kolchak's Vegas contact in the original Night Stalker TV movie.
 "Edhead" (Loreni Delgado): Technology specialist for the L.A. Beacon. Friend of Jain's.
 Alex Nyby (Eugene Byrd): Coroner's assistant at the Los Angeles Morgue. A contact of Kolchak's who drools over Perri.

Guest
 Damon Caylor (Tony Curran): A disfigured, blind Charles Manson-esque cult leader who uses supernatural powers to force the people who convicted him to kill their families.

Episodes

Cancellation
On November 13, 2005, Frank Spotnitz announced on his blog that Night Stalker was canceled. ABC announced the official cancellation of the series that following Monday. Night Stalker was canceled after six episodes due to low ratings.

Broadcast and release
Its first episode was broadcast on Thursday, September 29, at 9 p.m. against CSI: Crime Scene Investigation on CBS, The Apprentice on NBC and the 2005 MLB playoffs on Fox.

The last episode to be broadcast was the first of a multi-part episode, so viewers never saw the end of the sixth story.  However, some time after the cancellation, the seventh episode appeared on Apple's iTunes Music Store for download. On February 7, 2006, the final three episodes were released on iTunes.

The Sci-Fi Channel, which frequently shows canceled network genre shows, showed all ten filmed episodes during summer 2006, starting on July 28, 2006.  The ratings were poor on Sci-Fi Channel as well. In 2007, the show continued in rotation on the network's weekday series marathons.

Night Stalker has been re-run on the Chiller channel, beginning on November 3, 2007. In the UK the series aired in December 2007 and January 2008 on Bravo.

In Australia, the Seven Network free-to-air station and Prime in regional areas screened the series between early June and September 2007.

DVD release
Night Stalker: The Complete Series was released by Buena Vista Home Entertainment on May 30, 2006.

The set includes all ten episodes; commentary on the episodes "Pilot" and "The Source, Part Two"; deleted scenes; a featurette entitled "A Conversation with Frank Spotnitz"; and unproduced scripts in the DVD-ROM format.

References

External links
 Official ABC site
 
 Interview with Frank Spotnitz - Now Playing magazine

2000s American drama television series
2005 American television series debuts
2006 American television series endings
American Broadcasting Company original programming
Occult detective fiction
Television series reboots
Television series about journalism
Television series by ABC Studios
Television shows set in Los Angeles
The Night Stalker (franchise)